Thomas Charles Buckland McLeish  (1 May 1962 – 27 February 2023) was a British theoretical physicist.

His work is renowned for increasing understanding of the properties of soft matter. This is matter that can be easily changed by stress – including liquids, foams and biological materials. He was professor in the Durham University Department of Physics and director of the Durham Centre for Soft Matter, a multidisciplinary team that works across physics, chemistry, mathematics and engineering. He also was the first Chair of Natural Philosophy at the University of York.

Early life and education
McLeish was born on 1 May 1962. He was educated at Sevenoaks School in Kent and Emmanuel College, Cambridge where he was awarded a Bachelor of Arts degree in 1984 (MA, 1987) and a PhD in 1987 for research on fluid dynamics.

Academic career
McLeish began his academic career as a lecturer in physics at the University of Sheffield (1989 to 1993). He then moved to the University of Leeds, where he was Professor of Polymer Physics between 1993 and 2008. He was Professor of Physics at the University of Durham from 2008 to 2018. He was additionally Pro-Vice-Chancellor for Research between 2008 and 2014.

In February 2018, McLeish moved to the University of York to take up the newly created Chair in Natural Philosophy.

Research
Although McLeish's work was mostly theoretical, he also worked closely with those performing experiments and in industry. He made significant advances in modelling the structure and properties of complex entangled molecules, blends of substances that don't usually mix (multiphasic liquids like oil and water - see reptation and crazing). This allows complex fluid behaviour and processing in an industrial setting to be more easily predicted. Since 2000 he worked on biological physics: applying soft matter physics to self-assembly of protein fibrils, protein fluctuation dynamics and its role in allosteric signalling, and statistical mechanics approaches to evolution.  he had published around 200 papers in peer reviewed scientific journals.

Personal life
In 1984, McLeish married Julie Elizabeth King. Together they had four children: two sons and two daughters.

McLeish's other interests included historical studies of medieval science, and he was a member of the Institute of Medieval and Early Modern Studies at Durham. In 1993, he became a lay preacher in the Anglican Church, delivering sermons at St Michael le Belfrey, York. In 2014, he published a book on the relationship between religion and science called Faith and Wisdom in Science.

McLeish died on 27 February 2023, at the age of 60.

Honours
McLeish was made a Fellow of the Institute of Physics (FInstP) in 2003, and a Fellow of the Royal Society of Chemistry (FRSC) in 2008. In 2011, he was elected a Fellow of the Royal Society (FRS), the United Kingdom's national academy of the sciences.

In 2007, McLeish was awarded the Weissenberg medal by the European Society of Rheology. This is awarded to rheologists conducting research in Europe for outstanding, long-term achievements. 

McLeish also received the Society of Rheology's Bingham Medal in 2010.

In 2017, McLeish received the Sam Edwards Medal and Prize for "his sustained and outstanding contributions to the fields of molecular rheology, macromolecular biophysics and self-assembly".

In 2018, McLeish was awarded the Lanfranc Award for Education and Scholarship by the Archbishop of Canterbury "for his record as one of the most outstanding scientists of his generation, and the leading contemporary lay Anglican voice in the dialogue of science and faith".

McLeish gave the 2021 Boyle Lecture (International Society for Science and Religion, ISSR) entitled "Rediscovering Science as Contemplation." A recording is available on the ISSR's YouTube channel.

Selected publications 
 The Poetry and Music of Science: Comparing Creativity in Science and Art (2019) OXFORD University Press, 
 Soft Matter – An Emergent Interdisciplinary Science of Emergent Entities, Chapter 20 in The Routledge Handbook of Emergence, (eds.) (2019) LONDON: Routledge, 
The Science and Religion Delusion: Towards a Theology of Science, in Knowing Creation - Perspectives from Philosophy, Theology and Science Eds. (2018) Zondervan Academic, 
 Faith and Wisdom in Science (2016) OXFORD University Press,

References

External links

 

1962 births
2023 deaths
Deaths from pancreatic cancer 
Academics of Durham University 
Academics of the University of Cambridge 
Academics of the University of Sheffield
Academics of the University of York
Alumni of Emmanuel College, Cambridge 
British Anglicans 
British physicists 
Fellows of the American Physical Society 
Fellows of the Institute of Physics 
Fellows of the Royal Society 
Fellows of the Royal Society of Chemistry
Theoretical physicists 
Writers about religion and science